Robert Petre (died 1593), of St. Stephen's, Westminster and St. Botolph-without-Aldersgate, London, was an English Member of Parliament.

He was a Member (MP) of the Parliament of England for Fowey in 1571, for Penryn and Dartmouth.

References

16th-century births
1593 deaths
14th-century English people
People from London
Members of the Parliament of England (pre-1707)